Isurus is a genus of mackerel sharks in the family Lamnidae, commonly known as the mako sharks.

Description
The two living species are the common shortfin mako shark (I. oxyrinchus) and the rare longfin mako shark (I. paucus). They both have a distinctive blue-gray color scheme common among mackerel sharks.

Several extinct species are known from fossils found in sediments from the Cretaceous to the Quaternary (age range: 99.7 to 0.781 million years ago).

The family Lamnidae also includes the great white shark and the porbeagle. The great white shark is also closely related to an ancient mako shark species, Isurus hastalis. However, fossil evidence suggests I. hastalis, like the great white shark, also belonged to the genus Carcharodon.

Species
The genus contains these species:

 Isurus oxyrinchus (Rafinesque, 1810) (shortfin mako shark)
 Isurus paucus (Guitart-Manday, 1966) (longfin mako shark)
†Isurus desori (Agassiz, 1843)
†Isurus escheri  Agassiz 1843 (serrated mako shark)
†Isurus flandricus (Leriche, 1910)
†Isurus minutus (Agassiz, 1843)
†Isurus nakaminatoensis (Saito, 1961)
†Isurus planus (Agassiz, 1856) (hooked-tooth mako shark)
†Isurus praecursor (Leriche, 1905)
†Isurus rameshi (Mehrotra, Mishra & Srivastava, 1973)
†Isurus spallanzani  Rafinesque 1810

See also
 List of prehistoric cartilaginous fish
 Shark meat

References

 
Extant Late Cretaceous first appearances
Taxa named by Constantine Samuel Rafinesque
Shark genera